K. Arun Prakash (born 1968) is a Carnatic Musician, Percussionist, Composer and well known for playing Mridangam, a principal accompanying percussion instrument in South Indian Classical Carnatic Music.

Early life
K. Arun Prakash was born in Kumbakonam, Tamil Nadu, India in 1968 to famous music composer Kalai Mamani L. Krishnan (1938-2009, a disciple of Sangeeta Kalanidhi G N Balasubramaniam) and Vasantha Krishnan.

Arunprakash started his training in mridangam at the age of nine under the late Kalaimamani Ramanathapuram M. N.Kandaswamy (a disciple of the mridangam maestro Palani M.Subramania Pilla).

Arunprakash showed an immediate interest in playing Mridangam and started playing in concerts from the young age of eleven, just two years after the start of his training. Since then, he has given performances all over the world.

Career 
His career awards include

1984 - First prize from Shri Krishna Gana Sabha during their Gokhulashtami Series

1994 - Vishwapriya award for excellence

1996 - Yuva Kala Bharathi from Bharat Kalachar Chennai.
2000 - Kalki Memorial Award from Kalki Krishnamurthy trust (the first percussionist to receive the same).
1994, 1996, 1999, 2002, 2005, 2013 - Best Mridangist prizes from Music Academy Chennai, Tamil Nadu India

2012 - Vani Kala Nipuna award from Shri Thyaga Brahma Gana Saba (Vani Mahal).

Arun's mridangam artistry combines the best of tradition and modernity. While his technique of handling the instrument is very traditional, his playing is characterized by mathematical innovation, brilliance, and modernity. His playing is aesthetically satisfying and helps in enriching the overall vocal or instrument concert experience of the audience.

His playing style is incredibly musical, and he enhances the music to a different level altogether. His presence of mind and his composing skills merge to give a different dimension to the kriti niraval and swara rendered on stage. His cheerful nature brings a pleasant atmosphere to the concerts.

An A Grade artist of AIR & TV, Arunprakash has also participated in jugal bandhis and musical encounter concerts with American artists and Hindustani musicians organized by ICCR and Sampradaya Chennai
Arunprakash can also sing well and has a natural flair for composing music. He has lent his composing skills in many devotional recordings as well as composing the theme music for the millennium show presented by the YACM for The Music Academy on 31 December 1999.

Works 
Arun Prakash is also a composer and has composed tillanas and numerous pallavis sung by many musicians.
Arun Prakash conducted a program with Vidushi Sudha Ragunathan and Vidushi Aruna Sairam Titled " AIKYA 2017", where he designed, composed and conducted the show with a 21 member orchestra.
 Arun Prakash has released a CD titled ‘Sri Rama Jayarama,’ featuring 13 artists, which featured compositions on Lord Rama composed by various composers. Arun composed musical interludes arranged orchestrated the programme which was received very well.

References

Further reading 
 Important book to know about
 Important e-book to know about
 Important article to know about

External links 
 Arun Prakash: More than an accompanist by T.M. Krishna
 K Arun Prakash: Purveyor of Nadamrta by Sruti Magazine
Rendezvous with Arunprakash Krishnan - a conversation recorded in Cupertino, CA, Nov 2015
 I am a big fan of Ilaiyaraaja

1968 births
Living people
Carnatic composers
Carnatic musicians
Indian percussionists
Mridangam players